After the Earthquake is a dramatic short film that follows Irene, a young Nicaraguan immigrant living in California, as she faces new challenges—particularly in adjusting to the cultural, political, and economic differences between life in the United States and life in Nicaragua. It was written and directed by Lourdes Portillo with Nina Serrano, and stars Vilma Coronado, Agnelo Guzman, and Leticia Cortez. The film is in Spanish, with English subtitles, and runs for 27 minutes.

External links
After the Earthquake on Lourdes Portillo's website.
After the Earthquake in the Women Make Movies catalog
Lourdes Portillo retrospective at the Museum of Modern Art in New York City, June 22–30.

, posted by Lourdes Portillo

1979 films
American short films
Spanish-language American films
1979 short films
1970s Spanish-language films